Milan Stepišnik (11 November 1910 – 18 November 1950) was a Slovenian athlete. He competed in the men's hammer throw at the 1936 Summer Olympics, representing Yugoslavia.

During World War II, Stepisnik refused to make the Nazi salute in games; he was later imprisoned in Dachau, and following the Dachau trials he was sentenced to death by a firing squad.

References

External links
 

1910 births
1950 deaths
Athletes (track and field) at the 1936 Summer Olympics
Slovenian male hammer throwers
Olympic athletes of Yugoslavia
Place of birth missing